The Madagascar cuckoo (Cuculus rochii), also known as the Madagascar lesser cuckoo, is a species of cuckoo in the family Cuculidae.  Though it breeds only in Madagascar, it spends the non-breeding season in a number of countries in the African Great Lakes region and the Indian Ocean islands: Burundi, Democratic Republic of the Congo, Madagascar, Malawi, Rwanda, South Africa, Uganda and Zambia.

Description

References

Madagascar cuckoo
Birds of Madagascar
Birds of East Africa
Madagascar cuckoo
Taxonomy articles created by Polbot